is a Japanese anime television series created by director Satoshi Kon and produced by Madhouse about a social phenomenon in Musashino, Tokyo caused by a juvenile serial assailant named Lil' Slugger (the English equivalent to Shōnen Bat, which translates to "Bat Boy"). The plot relays between a large cast of people affected in some way by the phenomenon; usually Lil' Slugger's victims or the detectives assigned to apprehend him. As each character becomes the focus of the story, details are revealed about their secret lives and the truth about Lil' Slugger.

Plot

Tsukiko Sagi, a shy character designer who created the immensely popular pink dog Maromi, finds herself under pressure to repeat her success. As she walks home one night, she is attacked by an elementary school boy on inline skates. Two police detectives, Keiichi Ikari and Mitsuhiro Maniwa, are assigned to the case. They suspect that Tsukiko is lying about the attack, until they receive word of a second victim.

Soon the attacker, dubbed Lil' Slugger (Shōnen Batto in Japanese, meaning "Bat Boy"), is blamed for a series of street assaults in Tokyo. None of the victims can recall the boy's face and only three distinct details are left in their memories: golden inline skates, a baseball cap, and the weapon: a bent golden baseball bat. Ikari and Maniwa set out to track down the perpetrator and put an end to his crimes.

Names
Many of the characters in Paranoia Agent are often referred to with animal names, especially in each "Prophetic Vision" (a segment at the end of each episode that previews the next) and the episode "The Holy Warrior," in which some characters are depicted as animal-like creatures. In many cases, their Japanese names translate directly to the type of animal which they are referred to as: "sagi" means heron, "kawazu" is an archaic term for frog, "ushi" means cow, "tai" means sea bream or red snapper, "chō" means butterfly (chō-cho can also mean butterfly, possibly alluding to her split personality), and "hiru" means leech. "Kamome" means seagull.

Production
During the makings of his previous three films (Perfect Blue, Millennium Actress, and Tokyo Godfathers), Paranoia Agent creator Satoshi Kon was left with an abundance of unused ideas for stories and arrangements that he felt were good but did not fit into any of his projects. Not wanting to waste the material, he decided to recycle it into a dynamic TV series in which his experimental ideas could be used.

In the case of a film to be shown at theatres, I'm working for two years and a half, always in the same mood and with the same method. I wanted to do something that allows me to be more flexible, to realize instantly what flashes across my mind. I was also aiming at a sort of entertaining variation, so I decided to go for a TV series.

Media

Anime

The series aired on Japan's Wowow from February 3 to May 18, 2004. Geneon licensed the anime in North America and released the series on four DVDs from October 26, 2004, and May 10, 2005. A UMD version of Volume 1 was made available on October 10, 2005. Madman Entertainment released the series in Australia.
An English dub began airing in the U.S. on Cartoon Network's Adult Swim on May 29, 2005, followed by an encore airing that began on June 6, 2006. In Canada, it began a run on digital channel G4TechTV's Anime Current programming block on July 27, 2007. The anime is distributed by MVM Films in the UK. On February 3, 2020, Funimation announced that it had licensed the series for its streaming platform. On April 15, 2020, Adult Swim announced that the English dub would be rebroadcast for the first time in over a decade on its Toonami programming block. The Blu-ray collection of the series was released in the U.S. on October 13, 2020, in SteelBook packaging as a Best Buy exclusive, and received a general Blu-ray release on December 15, 2020.

Music

The music in Paranoia Agent was composed by Japanese electronica pioneer Susumu Hirasawa. The opening theme  and the ending theme  are performed by Hirasawa.

Proposed film
In December 2009, Japanese cult-film director Takashi Shimizu announced plans for a film adaption of the anime. However, plans eventually fell through and ultimately no film was ever made.

Reception
Review aggregator website Rotten Tomatoes gives the series the rare approval rating of 100% based on 13 critic reviews, with an average rating of 7.7/10. The site's critical consensus reads, "Anime auteur Satoshi Kon brings his feverish vision to the serialized form in Paranoia Agent, a disturbing meditation on individual and societal anxiety." Paranoia Agent was one of the Jury Recommended Works in the Animation Division at the 8th Japan Media Arts Festival in 2004.

Charles Solomon from NPR says, "Paranoia Agent may frustrate viewers who expect a straightforward narrative, but it's a disturbing, highly original work from a talented filmmaker." John Powers, also from NPR, remarks, "It's one of the best and strangest programs I have ever seen... Kon does something daring. He reveals the fierce sadness and pain hidden by the modern embrace of things that are cute." A review in Empire awarded Paranoia Agent 3 out of 5 stars, saying, "for those who like their animation 'out there', Satoshi Kon's Paranoia Agent delivers by the oddball bucketload". Jean-Luc Bouchard from BuzzFeed praised Paranoia Agent as a depiction of depression, writing, "The entire series totals a mere 13 episodes, but it drew me in immediately, and introduced me to a dark cast of characters whose troubled minds changed not just their own perceptions, but each other's realities as well."

James Beckett of Anime News Network gave the anime an A, and describes the series as "What is the most important thing to remember about Paranoia Agent is that it is a mystery story where the answers to the mysteries are not as important as the questions they raise. A haunting and deeply felt fable of human experiences told with Satoshi Kon's signature flair, eerie and funny in equal measure, visuals that will stick with you for years to come". A review for IGN gave the first three episodes of Paranoia Agent a score of 7/10, comparing it to the works of David Lynch, but criticizing the animation as "downright primitive in places". John Maher from Paste listed Paranoia Agent as the 14th best anime series of all time, comparing it to Kon's other works Paprika and Perfect Blue, adding, "it's every bit the sublime exercise in psychological thriller as either".

References

External links

 Paranoia Agent official website 
 
 

 
2004 anime television series debuts
2004 Japanese novels
Anime with original screenplays
Crunchyroll anime
Films directed by Satoshi Kon
Geneon USA
Madhouse (company)
Madman Entertainment anime
Mystery anime and manga
Psychological thriller anime and manga
Supernatural thriller anime and manga
Toonami
Wowow original programming